Núria Vilaplana i Buixons (1931 – 25 December 2016), better known as Núria Pompeia, was a Catalan Spanish cartoonist, graphic humorist, journalist in the Catalan and Castilian languages, and a Catalan writer in Catalan. 

Born and raised in Dreta de l'Eixample neighborhood, she studied art at the Escola Massana in Barcelona. She published her first cartoons in Oriflama in 1969. Her drawings often denoted social class, the bourgeoisie, or criticism of sexism. In more laid-back humor magazines, she also depicted censorship in a comic manner. Pompeia published novels and short stories, and worked in journalism. She died in Barcelona on 25 December 2016, aged 85.

Selected works

Comics & Graphic Humor 
 Maternasis, 1967 
 Y fueron felices comiendo perdices , 1970
 Pels segles dels segles, 1971
 La educación de Palmira, 1972
 Mujercitas, 1975
 Cambios y Recambios, 1991

Narrative 
 Cinc cèntims, 1981 (short stories)
 Mals endreços, 1997 (short stories)
 Inventari de l’últim dia, 1986 (novel)

Awards
2000: Gold Medal of the City of Barcelona for Artistic Merit
2007: Creu de Sant Jordi

References

External links

1931 births
2016 deaths
20th-century Spanish women artists
Writers from Barcelona
Women writers from Catalonia
Spanish cartoonists
Spanish women journalists
Journalists from Catalonia
Spanish feminists